Middle Cramer Lake is an alpine lake in Custer County, Idaho, United States, located in the Sawtooth Mountains in the Sawtooth National Recreation Area.  Sawtooth National Forest trail 154 leads to the lake.

Middle Cramer Lake is in the Sawtooth Wilderness, and a wilderness permit can be obtained at a registration box at trailheads or wilderness boundaries.  Downstream of Middle Cramer Lake is Lower Cramer Lake while Upper Cramer Lake is upstream. The lake is known for the waterfall that flows from the upper lake plunging directly into the middle lake.

References

See also
 List of lakes of the Sawtooth Mountains (Idaho)
 Sawtooth National Forest
 Sawtooth National Recreation Area
 Sawtooth Range (Idaho)

Lakes of Idaho
Lakes of Custer County, Idaho
Glacial lakes of the United States
Glacial lakes of the Sawtooth Wilderness